Ghosts of India is a BBC Books original novel written by Mark Morris and based on the long-running science fiction television series Doctor Who. It features the Tenth Doctor and Donna Noble and also Gandhi.

Summary
India in 1947 is a country in the grip of chaos - a country torn apart by internal strife. When the Doctor and Donna arrive in Calcutta, they are instantly swept up in violent events.

Barely escaping with their lives, they discover that the city is rife with tales of 'half-made men' who roam the streets at night and steal people away. These creatures, it is said, are as white as salt and have only shadows where their eyes should be. With help from India's great spiritual leader, Mahatma Gandhi, the Doctor and Donna set out to investigate these rumours.

What is the real truth behind the 'half-made men'? Why is Gandhi's role in history under threat? And has an ancient, all-powerful god of destruction really come back to wreak his vengeance upon the Earth?

Audiobook
An abridged audiobook was released on 12 March 2009, read by David Troughton, who is the son of Second Doctor actor, Patrick Troughton, and who also played Professor Winfold Hobbes in "Midnight".

See also

Whoniverse
List of artistic depictions of Mahatma Gandhi

References

External links

The Cloister Library - Ghosts of India

2008 British novels
2008 science fiction novels
New Series Adventures
Tenth Doctor novels
Novels by Mark Morris
Novels set in India
Partition of India in fiction
Cultural depictions of Mahatma Gandhi